Commandant's Quarters or Commandant's House may refer to:

 Commandant's Quarters (Dearborn, Michigan), listed on the NRHP in Michigan
 Commandant's Quarters (Fort Gibson, Oklahoma), listed on the NRHP in Oklahoma
 Commandant's House (Walnut Ridge, Arkansas), listed on the NRHP in Arkansas
Commandant of Cadets Building, US Air Force Academy, Aurora, CO, listed on the NRHP in Colorado
 Commandant's House (Hillsborough, North Carolina), listed on the NRHP in North Carolina
 Commandant's House (Oak Ridge, North Carolina), part of the Oak Ridge Military Academy Historic District in Oak Ridge, North Carolina
Dragoon Commandant's Quarters, Fort Gibson, Oklahoma, listed on the NRHP in Oklahoma
 Commandant's Quarters (Philadelphia, Pennsylvania), listed on the NRHP in Philadelphia, Pennsylvania
Commandant's Residence, Quarters Number One, Fort Adams, Newport, RI, listed on the NRHP in Rhode Island
Commandant's Office, Washington Navy Yard, Washington, D.C., listed on the NRHP in Washington, D.C.
Commandant's Residence (Home King, Wisconsin), listed on the NRHP in Wisconsin
U.S. Marine Corps Barracks and Commandant's House, Washington, D.C.
 Commandant's Residence, Royal Military College of Canada, Kingston, Ontario, Canada